is a manga by Yasue Imai licensed in the U.S. by VIZ Media.

The story revolves around little Airi from Okinawa who enters the Actors school dreaming of appearing in the TV show called Boom Boom (hence the B.B. in the title).

Plot
Airi is a talented young girl who dreams about making a big splash in show business one day. Unfortunately, she lives in Okinawa. And that's the wrong place to be for little girls with stars in their eyes.

But hope springs eternal for all dreamers. Each week, a variety show called Boom Boom showcases fresh and exciting talent on TV. Airi decides she has to be on that show. With that goal in mind, she enrolls at an actor's school in the big city.

Inspired by her new environs, Airi is determined to turn the world on with her smile. But, of course, there are hundreds of other kids at school with exactly the same dream. The competition is fierce, but with hard work and much charm, Airi has taken her first step in becoming Japan's next big thing.

Characters 
Airi Ishikawa
 Airi is a young girl who dreams of meeting her idol Issa from the boy band Da Pump. She initially enrolls in Actors to pursue this dream, but she soon discovers her intense passion for singing and the impact she's able to have upon others. She is very lively and sweet, but she sometimes compares herself negatively to other people.

Yū Yamada
 Yū also dreams of becoming a brilliant singer and dancer, but she is also thinking about becoming a model. Yū tends to act overly excited and refers to herself in the third person.

Yumi Kōchi
 Yumi is older than Airi and Yū, but they are still friends. For her audition for Actors, she performed a duet with her best friend. Only Yumi was admitted, though. Yumi is more serious and also has the tendency to get hungry easily.

Da Pump
 A boy band whose members graduated from Actors as soon as Airi was admitted. The group features includes the popular Issa, who was Airi's inspiration for attending the school.

External links 
Official site at VIZ Media, with the first chapter readable online.

Mania.com vol. 1 review
Anime Fringe vol. 1 review

1997 manga
Shogakukan manga
Shōjo manga
Viz Media manga